The Château de Bourdeilles is a castle located in the commune of Bourdeilles in the Dordogne département in southwestern France. A castle may have existed at Bourdeilles in the 9th century, but the oldest parts of the current castle date from the early 14th century. The castle consists of an octagonal keep, connected to a two-story building of which only the outer walls remain. Next to the old castle, a Renaissance palace was built at the end of the 16th century. Much of the interior decoration has been preserved. The castle and the palace are surrounded by a wall. The entrance gate is protected by two round towers. Since 1919, the château has been listed as a monument historique by the French Ministry of Culture.

References

 Dominique Audrerie, Visiter le château de Bourdeilles (Visit the château de Bourdeilles), Éditions Sud-Ouest, Paris, 2005 .
 Marquis de Bourdeille, La maison de Bourdeille ("The House of Bourdeille"), Troyes, 1893.
 Brigitte et Gilles Deluc, Maurice Lantonnat, Pierre Vidal, "Découverte de bas-reliefs au château de Bourdeilles", B.S.H.A.P tome XCV-1968.
 Géraud Lavergne, "Le château de Bourdeilles" ("The château de Bourdeilles"), in Congrès archéologique de Périgueux de 1927 (Archeological Congress of Périgueux of 1927), Paris, 1928.
 Pierre Pommarède, Brantôme et Bourdeilles oubliés, Éditions Pierre Fanlac, Périgueux, 1980.
 Jean Secret, Le château de Bourdeilles, Departmental Tourism Office, Périgueux, 1980.

External links

 http://www.bourdeilles.com/
 Homepage of the château de Bourdeilles at the Semitour Périgord website

Castles in Nouvelle-Aquitaine
Châteaux in Dordogne
Monuments historiques of Dordogne
Historic house museums in Nouvelle-Aquitaine
Museums in Dordogne